Hans-Joachim von Merkatz (7 July 1905 – 25 February 1982) was a German politician. He was Federal Minister of Justice from 1956 to 1957. He was a member of the Bundestag from 1949 to 1961. He was a member of the German Party before joining the Christian Democrats in 1960.

Early life
Merkatz was born at Stargard in the Prussian province of Pomerania into a family of Prussian officers and functionaries, ennobled in 1797. His father, a Hauptmann (Captain) in the Imperial German Army, died near Vilnius in 1915, on the Eastern Front of World War I. Merkatz received his primary education in Wiesbaden (Hesse), Jena and Naumburg (both in Thuringia). Initially immatriculated for agriculture, he turned to study law and national economics at the University of Jena from 1928 to 1931.

Third Reich
Merkatz received his doctorate at the University of Jena in 1934 and his approbation as a lawyer in 1935. The same year, von Merkatz started lecturing foreign and international law at the Kaiser Wilhelm Society in Berlin. In 1938, he became secretary general of both the Ibero-American Institute and the German-Spanish Society, both in Berlin. The German-Spanish Society, founded in 1918, was concerned with the public relations to Spain. Since the Nazi take-over of 1933, the society was increasingly incorporated into the Nazi propaganda apparatus, and used to propagate the New Order ideology.

When World War II broke out in 1939, he was drafted into Wehrmacht service, but retired in 1941 due to a severe illness. He then continued to work at his post in Berlin, until the Soviet Red Army advanced towards Berlin. The final stages of the war had confronted Merkatz with decreasing loyalty to the Axis powers in Spain and seizure of Eastern Germany by the Soviets. He nevertheless remained confident in the final succession of the New Order and in the ability of the German forces to repel and avenge the Soviet forces. During the Battle of Berlin, Merkatz's parents-in-law were killed by Soviet forces in Wusterwitz (Brandenburg), and the family fled westward to settle in Hämelschenburg near Emmerthal (Lower Saxony). The experiences during the final days of the war manifested a strong sense of anti-Communism in Merkatz's personality.

Post-war period

After the war, Merkatz became an employee at the Academy for Area Planning, Hanover, in 1945. He joined the conservative German Party (DP, Deutsche Partei), and acted as its legal consultant from 1946 to 1949. He was voted into the West German federal parliament, Bundestag, in 1949, and remained a Member of Parliament until 1961. From 1949 to 1952, he was Secretary of State in the Federal Ministry for Affairs of the Federal Council (BMBR, Bundesministerium für Angelegenheiten des Bundesrates). From 1950 to 1955, he was vice chairman of the DP Bundestag fraction, and its chairman from 1953 to 1955.

From 1951 to 1958, Merkatz was a member of the Consultative Assembly of the Council of Europe, and from 1952 to 1958, of the Common Assembly of the European Coal and Steel Community. From 1952 to 1960, he was a member of the directorate and the party executive committee of the DP. From 1955 to 1961, he was Federal Minister for Affairs of the Federal Council.

Merkatz was appointed Federal Minister of Justice on October 17, 1956, and remained in that office until October 21, 1957. In October 1957, Merkatz was the focus of an East German propaganda campaign, which portrayed him as a "fascist" and "leading Nazi functionary". The campaign was, however, mounted untimely: due to a re-arrangement of the ruling coalition after the 1957 West German federal election in September, Merkatz resigned from his office. He was replaced by former minister for finance, Fritz Schäffer.

In 1960, Merkatz left the German Party to become a member of the Christian Democratic Union (CDU, Christlich Demokratische Union). He was Federal Minister for Expellees, Refugees and War Invalids (Bundesminister für Vertriebene, Flüchtlinge und Kriegsgeschädigte) from 1960 to 1961, and the West German representative in the Executive Council of the UNESCO.

Conservative movements
In a Bundestag speech of 1951, Merkatz avowed himself as a monarchist. He also upheld his contacts to Franco's Spain and joined the European Documentation and Information Centre (CEDI). President of its German faction, Merkatz was in close personal contact with Otto von Habsburg, president of the CEDI. In 1956, he joined the Central Council of von Habsburg's International Paneuropean Union, and was president of its German faction from 1967 to 1979. In his own words, von Merkatz's political aim was the "conservative rebirth of the Christian occident", whereby conservativism was understood by him not as an eligible political concept, but as an integral feature of personality. Merkatz was a founding member of the Abendländische Akademie ("Occidental Academy"), a Christian-conservative circle operating since 1952.

In February 1956, the Abendländische Akademie became subject to a press campaign initiated by Der Spiegel, claiming the academy's activities were in violation of the German constitution. This resulted in investigation by a parliamentary commission and the eventual decline of the academy. During the affair, Merkatz as one of the academy's leading persons rejected the claims of disobedience to the constitution, but added that because it was rooted in "secular morality", it was "incomplete" for the "conservative mind".

Death
Hans-Joachim von Merkatz died in Bonn on February 25, 1982.

Notes

References

Bibliography

External links

Publications by Hans-Joachim von Merkatz, German National Library

1905 births
1982 deaths
People from Stargard
People from the Province of Pomerania
German Party (1947) politicians
German untitled nobility
Justice ministers of Germany
Members of the Bundestag for Lower Saxony
Members of the Bundestag 1965–1969
Members of the Bundestag 1961–1965
Members of the Bundestag 1957–1961
Members of the Bundestag 1953–1957
Members of the Bundestag 1949–1953
Max Planck Institute for Comparative Public Law and International Law people
University of Jena alumni
Ludwig Maximilian University of Munich alumni
German monarchists
German anti-communists
20th-century German lawyers
Grand Crosses 1st class of the Order of Merit of the Federal Republic of Germany
Members of the Bundestag for the Christian Democratic Union of Germany